Piarun may refer to:
Perun, the Slavic god of thunder and lightning
Piaparan, a cooking process using spicy grated coconut from the Maranao people of the Philippines